is the 55th single by Japanese boy band Arashi. It was released on July 25, 2018 under their record label J Storm. "Natsu Hayate" was used as the theme song for Netto Koshien's 100th Japanese High School Baseball Championship.

Single information
"Natsu Hayate" was released in three editions: a limited edition, a regular edition, and a limited "High School Baseball" edition. The limited editions feature a CD containing two songs and a karaoke track of the B-side song, as well as a DVD containing the music video and making of the single's title track "Natsu Hayate". The "High School Baseball" edition features a brass band version of "Natsu Hayate" along with the collaboration version of the music video. The regular edition contains three songs, each of which comes with an original karaoke track.

Songs
"Natsu Hayate" was used for ABC High School Baseball Fight Song and is the theme for Netto Koshien. Yujin Kitagawa of Yuzu was in charge of handling the lyrics and music. As a special "Arashi x Yuzu" collaboration project, this song is expected to bring a lot of excitement to this year's momentous 100th summer Koshien tournament. "Natsu Hayate" is the first song to be released during summer after a while. With the song made for summer, the song takes the freshness and brightness of summer, places it on top of a melody that's sure to energize, and turns it into a fight song celebrating all the high school students out there who are doing their best.

Track listing

Charts

References

External links
Product information at the official website 

2018 singles
2018 songs
Arashi songs